Jason John Lowe (born 2 September 1991) is an English professional footballer who plays for  club Salford City. He has played much of his career as a midfielder, but he has also been used as a right back.

Lowe has spent most his career at Blackburn Rovers, making his debut in 2011, and cementing his place in the first team in the same year. He continued in the first team until his departure in 2017. He spent the 2017–18 season with Birmingham City before joining Bolton.

Lowe made his international debut for the England under-20 team in 2011, captained his country at the 2011 FIFA U-20 World Cup, and made his under-21 debut that same year.

Early life
Lowe was born in Wigan, Greater Manchester and raised in nearby Leigh. He attended St. Thomas C.E. Primary School in Leigh.

Club career

Blackburn Rovers
Lowe joined Blackburn Rovers' Academy as an under-12 and had progressed to the Reserves when he signed his first professional contract on 4 September 2009. On 8 January 2011, he made his senior debut in the 1–0 win over Queens Park Rangers in the first round of the FA Cup. A week later, he made his first appearance in the Premier League, as a 24th-minute substitute for the injured David Dunn in a 2–0 loss to Chelsea. Lowe was set to join Aberdeen on loan before the deal fell through due to injuries in the Blackburn first team.

On 24 March, he joined Oldham Athletic of League One on loan until the end of the season, to gain experience of competitive first-team football. Lowe made his Oldham debut against Tranmere Rovers four days later, and scored his first goal for the club with a penalty in the 2–0 win against Notts County on 3 April. On 25 April 2011, he "fired into the top corner late on" to help Oldham secure a 1–1 draw with Walsall on 25 April, and he finished his loan spell with two goals from seven appearances.

Lowe's next appearance for Blackburn came in the League Cup second-round win against Sheffield Wednesday on 24 August 2011. He made his first league appearance of the season, as a substitute for Rubén Rochina against Fulham on 11 September, and his first league start for Blackburn six days later against Arsenal. After producing what BBC Sport dubbed "a string of impressive displays", Lowe signed a five-year contract with Blackburn. He continued to be a first team regular, playing in a variety of positions; according to manager Steve Kean, "he can play right-back, holding midfield player, wide right, doubling up with a full-back, he can play box-to-box as a genuine midfield player". He was twice suspended in the 2011–12 season, but still made 37 appearances in all competitions as Blackburn Rovers were relegated from the Premier League.

At the start of the 2012–13 season, manager Steve Kean spoke of Lowe as one of several players in contention for a place in defence. He started the opening Championship match, away to Ipswich Town, at left back, and scored a late own goal to give the hosts a draw. The following week, he set up the opening goal for Nuno Gomes in a 2–1 win over Leicester City. He started regularly in midfield in October 2012 under caretaker manager Eric Black, but a hamstring injury then kept him out for a month. Against a background of continued managerial changes, Lowe established himself in Blackburn's midfield, and finished the season with 42 appearances in all competitions.

In the 2013–14 season, Lowe continued as a regular in midfield, and in October he signed a contract extension to run until 2017. Manager Gary Bowyer said that if Lowe wanted to make himself into "that old-fashioned midfielder that can do a bit of everything", he needed to start scoring goals. Four days later, he obliged, with a "thunderous 25-yard strike into the top corner" at home to Middlesbrough that earned him the club's Goal of the Season award. Speaking afterwards, he said "I don't think the phrase Jason Lowe and match-winner go together very often, so that's something that's nice to change. As soon as I hit it I knew it had a chance and when I saw it was on target and it flew in it was an unbelievable feeling. After Lowe's third consecutive man-of-the-match performance, teammate and former England international David Dunn discussed his potential in glowing terms. He made his 100th appearance for the club on 3 December, in a 3–1 loss against Ipswich Town, and went on to make 42 appearances in all competitions over the season.

Ahead of the 2014–15 season, Lowe said he was targeting more goals, but Rovers' shortage of defenders through injury meant he reverted to the right-back position, and then injury intervened. A stress fracture in his foot kept him out for several months, and a week after his return to the side, he suffered a recurrence of the injury during a 2–0 win over Charlton Athletic on 20 December. He came back into the team apparently fully fit a month later, producing what Bowyer dubbed a terrific performance against Wigan Athletic on 17 January 2015, but the injury recurred yet again in mid-February and Lowe underwent surgery that kept him out for the rest of the season. Four appearances into the 2015–16 season his foot let him down yet again and he had another operation. Having spent six months on the sidelines, Lowe returned to action with the reserve side to regain his match fitness. He returned to the first team on 9 April in the starting eleven for a goalless draw away to Wolverhampton Wanderers, and started four of the remaining five matches.

After Grant Hanley left the club, Lowe was appointed captain for the 2016–17 season. The team struggled, and he himself had disciplinary issues: he received his tenth yellow cardhis fifth in six appearanceson 17 December, so by the end of the year had missed three matches through suspension. As the season progressed, Rovers' form dipped and they settled in the relegation zone. In the penultimate match of the season, against Aston Villa, Lowe supplied the cross for Danny Graham's winning goal; the result left survival in their own hands. On the final day, Rovers won 3–1 at Brentford, but other results went against them and they were relegated to League One. Lowe was one of eight players released. In a farewell message, he thanked staff and supporters who had helped him "grow as a man and a player" over 13 years with the club, and said that Blackburn Rovers would always have a special place in his heart.

Birmingham City
Lowe signed a one-year contract with Championship club Birmingham City on 31 August 2017. He was one of six debutants in the starting eleven for Birmingham's next fixture, away to Norwich City; he played 78 minutes and was yellow-carded in the first half as his team lost 1–0. After just two minutes of his home debut a week later, Lowe injured a hamstringthe fifth such injury sustained by Birmingham players in the first few weeks of the season.

He was released by Birmingham at the end of the 2017–18 season.

Bolton Wanderers
After his release from Birmingham, Lowe became Championship club Bolton Wanderers' first signing of the 2018 summer transfer window when he signed a two-year deal on 8 June. He made his debut for Bolton on 4 August when starting Wanderers' 2–1 victory over West Bromwich Albion at The Hawthorns. Lowe began the 2019–2020 season as captain. This lasted until 17 September, when Liam Bridcutt became captain. Lowe became captain again after Bridcutt left. On 26 June it was announced Lowe would be one of 14 senior players released at the end of his contract on 30 June.

Salford City
On 22 July 2020, Lowe joined League Two club Salford City on a three-year deal. He made his competitive debut on 5 September in the EFL Cup, in a 1–1 draw against Championship side Rotherham United. Salford won on penalties. On 13 March 2021 he started the EFL Trophy Final against League One side Portsmouth, which finished 0–0. He scored the winning penalty in the shootout, winning the trophy for Salford.

International career

England U19 and U20
Lowe was called into a training camp for England U19 after impressing for Blackburn in the Academy and reserves and was on stand-by for the U-19 which travelled to Ukraine for the UEFA European Under-19 Championship Elite Qualifying Round. Lowe was selected for England U-19 for the UEFA European Under-19 Championship Finals in July 2010, but eventually missed out due to injury.

Lowe made his debut for England U-20 in a friendly against France on 9 February 2011. In July 2011, Lowe was included for the England U–20 squad at the 2011 FIFA U-20 World Cup in Colombia, joining his teammate Josh Morris. Prior to the FIFA U-20 World Cup, Lowe made his only cap before he captained England U-20 at the FIFA U-20 World Cup in Colombia in the summer of 2011, where they were knocked out in the last 16.

England U21
After playing for England U20, Lowe was called up by England U21 and appeared as an unused substitute against Iceland national under-21 football team on 7 October 2011. On 10 October 2011, Lowe made his debut for England U21 in a 2–1 win against Norway U21 in a Euro 2013 qualifier.

Lowe made his two more appearances for England U21 later in November 2011 against Iceland U21 and Belgium U21.

Lowe continued to be recalled by England U21 for the Euro qualifier on several occasions and became a first team regular in England's U21 squad until June 2013

In May 2013, Lowe was called up again for the UEFA European Under-21 Championship in Israel. Lowe played two matches, as England U21 were eliminated in the Group stage. This turns out to be his last appearance for the England U21 squad.

Personal life
During his six-year spell at Blackburn Rovers, Lowe was named the club's first Player Ambassador by Blackburn Rovers Community Trust.

Career statistics

Honours
Salford City
EFL Trophy: 2019–20

References

External links

Profile  at the Bolton Wanderers F.C. website

1991 births
Living people
Footballers from Wigan
Footballers from Leigh, Greater Manchester
English footballers
England youth international footballers
England under-21 international footballers
Association football midfielders
Blackburn Rovers F.C. players
Oldham Athletic A.F.C. players
Birmingham City F.C. players
Bolton Wanderers F.C. players
Salford City F.C. players
Premier League players
English Football League players